Clemens Wenzel (born 23 August 1988) is a German rower. He competed in the men's double sculls event at the 2008 Summer Olympics.

References

External links
 

1988 births
Living people
German male rowers
Olympic rowers of Germany
Rowers at the 2008 Summer Olympics
Sportspeople from Prenzlau